Cláír Ní Aonghusa (born 1953) is an Irish novelist and poet.

She was born in Dublin where she lives. She has published two novels, Four Houses and A Marriage (Poolbeg 1997) and Civil and Strange (Houghton & Mifflin 2008).

References

1953 births
20th-century Irish people
21st-century Irish people
Living people
Irish novelists
Irish poets
Irish women poets
Irish women novelists